Charles John "Butch" Schmidt (July 19, 1886 – September 4, 1952) was a Major League Baseball infielder who played from – for the Boston Braves and New York Highlanders.

In 1914, Schmidt was a member of the Braves team that went from last place to first place in two months, becoming the first team to win a pennant after being in last place on the Fourth of July. The team then went on to defeat Connie Mack's heavily favored Philadelphia Athletics in the 1914 World Series.

In 297 games over four seasons, Schmidt posted a .272 batting average (292-for-1075) with 119 runs, 4 home runs, 145 RBI and 81 bases on balls. He finished his career with a .988 fielding percentage as a first baseman. In the 1914 World Series, he hit .294 (5-for-17) with 2 runs and 2 RBI.

References

External links

1886 births
1952 deaths
Major League Baseball infielders
Baseball players from Baltimore
Boston Braves players
New York Highlanders players
Holyoke Papermakers players
Baltimore Orioles (IL) players
Rochester Hustlers players